is a Japanese manga series written and illustrated by Maybe. It started serialization in Monthly Big Gangan in March 2014 and has been published in thirteen volumes thus far. An anime television series adaptation has been announced.

Characters

Media

Manga
The series is written and illustrated by Maybe, and started serialization in Monthly Big Gangan on March 25, 2014. In the tenth tankōbon volume, it was revealed the series would continue "for just a little longer". In July 2021, it was revealed that it would reach its climax in the next issue of the magazine, which will be released on August 25, 2021. As of January 2023, the series' individual chapters have been collected into thirteen tankōbon volumes.

In May 2015, Crunchyroll announced they would add the series to their digital manga service Crunchyroll Manga. At Anime Expo 2017, Yen Press announced they also licensed the series for English publication.

Volume list

Virtual reality
In November 2017, it was announced that a virtual reality version of the manga was in development. The adaptation was first released in March 2018 at Square Enix's AnimeJapan booth. It was made available on the HTC Vive on September 25, 2018.

Anime
In January 2023, an anime television series adaptation was announced.

Reception
Rebecca Silverman from Anime News Network praised the characters, fan service, and use of body language, while criticizing characters' facial expressions and the story's direction. Brandon Varnell from The Fandom Post also praised the series, especially the plot due to it not sticking to trends established by other works. Takato from Manga News also offered praise for the story, calling it a promising start.

See also
Dusk Maiden of Amnesia, another manga series with the same creator
To the Abandoned Sacred Beasts, another manga series with the same creator

References

External links
 Official manga website 
 Official anime website 
 

Anime series based on manga
Crunchyroll manga
Fantasy anime and manga
Gangan Comics manga
Isekai anime and manga
Romance anime and manga
Seinen manga
Upcoming anime television series
Yen Press titles